Ghulam Hassan Lobsang is recognized for his contribution to promoting Balti language and Balti culture in Baltistan, a region in the north of Pakistan. He was a Government Servant (now retired) in Accounts Department but more active in the literary sphere of the region and is influential in promoting the region's local culture, tradition and language. Lobsang has primarily written reference texts and fictional material based on Baltistan's local traditions and culture.

The Bon Philosophy (1997) is recognized as Lobsang's major text. The book outlines religious and cultural changes within the Baltistan region over past centuries and explores the impact of local belief systems on the lives of the region's inhabitants in the post-Islamic era.

Lobsang also authored Balti Language Grammar. This text was initially released in Urdu and Persian languages; however, the text was subsequently translated into English and was released under the title of Balti English Grammar by Bern University, Switzerland in 1995.  This text is used as a key reference tool by students studying Balti language at Bern University.

Further texts by Lobsang include:
Mimang Rgiastit (series)
1. *Lobsang
2. *Losar
3. *Kessar
4. *Yul Ann
5. *Sang
Aot (A balti translation of quotations of great thinkers.)

See also
List of Pakistani writers
Skardu District
Geography of Gilgit–Baltistan

References

Year of birth missing (living people)
Pakistani writers
Balti people
People from Gilgit-Baltistan
People from Skardu District
Living people